Bergen County Technical High School may refer to:
 Bergen County Technical High School, Paramus Campus
 Bergen County Technical High School, Teterboro Campus